Broomstick (1901–1931) was a Thoroughbred race horse whose most important win was in the 1904 Travers Stakes. After retirement, he became one of the great sires in American racing history, leading the North American sire list in 1913, 1914 and 1915. He was inducted into the National Museum of Racing and Hall of Fame in 1956.

Background
The important horseman, James R. Keene (who owned Domino, Kingston, Colin and Sysonby among so many other memorable horses), also owned Elf, Broomstick's dam. He bred her to leading sire Ben Brush, but believing she was barren, he sold her to Milton Young, One year later she foaled Broomstick at the famous McGrathiana Stud in Kentucky. As a yearling Broomstick then went to a Pittsburgh, Pennsylvania coal millionaire named Captain Samuel S. Brown who was a member of The Jockey Club and the owner of two racetracks.

Racing career
Broomstick was small, but he won his first three stakes at two for trainer Peter Wimmer. Because of this, he was weighted down rather heavily for such a young horse and consequently won fewer races at that age. He placed in the Saratoga Special, the Walden Stakes, the Flatbush Stakes, the Great Trial Stakes and the Spring Stakes.

At three, and under new trainer Robert Tucker, he won the Travers Stakes at Saratoga and the Flying Handicap at Sheepshead Bay. In winning the Brighton Handicap he beat older horses and set a track record that stood for nine years. In that race he was up against the truly game Irish Lad who broke down nearing the wire, but finished on three legs, only barely beaten.

Still heavily weighted, he placed in the Merchants and Citizens Handicap, the Hindoo Handicap, and his second Saratoga Special.

At four his only important effort was a place in the Century Handicap.

At stud
Broomstick was retired to stud duty at Capt. Brown's Senorita Stock Farm near Lexington, Kentucky where he sired three crops including 1911 Kentucky Derby winner Meridian, Sweeper II who raced in England and in 1912 won the Classic 2,000 Guineas Stakes, and the 1913 American Horse of the Year Whisk Broom II who went on to sire Whiskery, the winner of the 1927 Kentucky Derby. Capt. Brown died in late 1905 and his brother, W. Harry Brown, continued on with the business until November 23, 1908 when he sold Broomstick and twenty-eight other horses at a Fasig-Tipton auction. 
 
Purchased by Harry Payne Whitney, Broomstick was sent to stand at his Brookdale Farm in Lincroft, New Jersey where he continued as a great sire. Even with only an average eleven foals per crop, of those eleven foals twenty five percent were stakes winners. The best of the lot was Regret, the first filly to win the Kentucky Derby which she did in 1915. He also sired Cudgel who, in his time, beat Exterminator, Sun Briar, Johren, and Roamer. And then there was the extraordinary Tippity Witchet who raced 266 times over thirteen seasons and won 78 of those starts, came in second 52 times, and third 42 times.

Broomstick was America's leading sire from 1913 to 1915 and among the top ten for 17 years: 1910 to 1927. From 280 named foals, he sired 207 winners, of which 67 were stakes winners. He was also an important broodmare sire, leading the North American list in 1932 and 1933.

Broomstick died on March 24, 1931 at age 30 and was buried at the C.V. Whitney Farm in Lexington, Kentucky. In 1956 he was inducted into the U.S. Racing Hall of Fame.

Pedigree

External links
 Broomstick's pedigree
 The Spell of the Turf by Sam Hildreth and James R. Crowell

References

1901 racehorse births
1931 racehorse deaths
Racehorses bred in Kentucky
Racehorses trained in the United States
Horse racing track record setters
United States Champion Thoroughbred Sires
American Champion Thoroughbred broodmare sires
United States Thoroughbred Racing Hall of Fame inductees
Thoroughbred family 16
Chefs-de-Race